Meeting Leila (Persian: Ashnaee ba Leila) is a 2012 film by the Iranian actor-director Adel Yaraghi. Yaraghi also produced the movie, co-wrote the script with Abbas Kiarostami, and acted in the film opposite Leila Hatami. It was exhibited at the Chicago International Film Festival where it was nominated for a Golden Hugo.

References

Iranian drama films